The Magnoliales are an order of flowering plants.

Classification
The Magnoliales include six families:
 Annonaceae (custard apple family, over 2000 species of trees, shrubs, and lianas; mostly tropical but some temperate)
 Degeneriaceae (two species of trees found on Pacific islands)
 Eupomatiaceae (two species of trees and shrubs found in New Guinea and eastern Australia)
 Himantandraceae (two species of trees and shrubs, found in tropical areas in Southeast Asia and Australia)
 Magnoliaceae (about 225 species including magnolias and tulip trees)
 Myristicaceae (several hundred species including nutmeg)

APG system
The APG system (1998), APG II system (2003), APG III system (2009), and APG IV system (2016) place this order in the clade magnoliids, circumscribed as follows:

In these systems, published by the APG, the Magnoliales are a basal group, excluded from the eudicots.

Earlier systems
The Cronquist system (1981) placed the order in the subclass Magnoliidae of class Magnoliopsida (=dicotyledons) and used this circumscription: 
 order Magnoliales
 family Annonaceae
 family Austrobaileyaceae
 family Canellaceae
 family Degeneriaceae
 family Eupomatiaceae
 family Himantandraceae
 family Lactoridaceae
 family Magnoliaceae
 family Myristicaceae
 family Winteraceae

The Thorne system (1992) placed the order in superorder Magnolianae, subclass Magnoliidae (= dicotyledons), in the class Magnoliopsida (= angiosperms) and used this circumscription (including the plants placed in order Laurales and Piperales by other systems):
 order Magnoliales
 family Amborellaceae
 family Annonaceae
 family Aristolochiaceae
 family Austrobaileyaceae
 family Calycanthaceae
 family Canellaceae
 family Chloranthaceae
 family Degeneriaceae
 family Eupomatiaceae
 family Gomortegaceae
 family Hernandiaceae
 family Himantandraceae
 family Illiciaceae
 family Lactoridaceae
 family Lauraceae
 family Magnoliaceae
 family Monimiaceae
 family Myristicaceae
 family Piperaceae
 family Saururaceae
 family Schisandraceae
 family Trimeniaceae
 family Winteraceae

The Engler system, in its update of 1964, placed the order in subclassis Archychlamydeae in class Dicotyledoneae (=dicotyledons) and used this circumscription: 
 order Magnoliales
 family Amborellaceae
 family Annonaceae
 family Austrobaileyaceae
 family Calycanthaceae
 family Canellaceae
 family Cercidiphyllaceae
 family Degeneriaceae
 family Eupomatiaceae
 family Eupteleaceae
 family Gomortegaceae
 family Hernandiaceae
 family Himantandraceae
 family Illiciaceae
 family Lauraceae
 family Magnoliaceae
 family Monimiaceae
 family Myristicaceae
 family Schisandraceae
 family Trimeniaceae
 family Tetracentraceae
 family Trochodendraceae
 family Winteraceae

The Wettstein system, latest version published in 1935, did not use this name although it had an order with a similar circumscription with the name Polycarpicae. This was placed in the Dialypetalae in subclass Choripetalae of class Dicotyledones. (See also Sympetalae).

From the above it will be clear that the plants included in this order by APG have always been seen as related. They have always been placed in the order Magnoliales (or a predecessor). The difference is that earlier systems have also included other plants, which have been moved to neighbouring orders (in the magnoliids) by APG.

References
	

 
Angiosperm orders